Shirley Erena Murray  (née Cockroft; 31 March 1931 – 25 January 2020) was a New Zealand hymn lyrics writer. Her hymns have been translated into numerous languages and are represented in more than 140 hymn collections.

Biography
Born in Invercargill and raised a Methodist, she was educated at Southland Girls' High School, and earned a Master of Arts degree with honours in classics and French from the University of Otago. She later worked as a teacher and researcher.

After marrying Presbyterian minister John Murray in 1954, she eventually moved to Wellington where John was minister for the St Andrew's on the Terrace from 1975 to 1993. Her hymn writing started in the 1970s and often used the congregation of St Andrew's as a testing place for the hymns. Many different composers have put music to her hymn texts.

Her hymns have been translated into several European and Asian languages and are represented in more than 140 hymn books around the world. In addition to New Zealand, they are particularly used in North America.

Among her most known hymns are "Hymn for Anzac Day", "Where Mountains Rise to Open Skies", "Our life has its Seasons", "Star Child" and "Upside Down Christmas".

Professor and hymn writer Colin Gibson, who has set music to some of her songs, described Murray's hymns in 2009 as "distinguished by their inclusive language and their innovative use of Māori, their bold appropriation of secular terms and their original poetic imagery drawn from nature and domestic life, but equally by the directness with which they confront contemporary issues."

In the 2001 Queen's Birthday Honours, Murray was appointed a Member of the New Zealand Order of Merit, for services as a hymn writer. In 2006, she became a fellow of the Royal School of Church Music. She received an honorary doctor of literature degree from the University of Otago in 2009. The same year, she was named a fellow of the Hymn Society in the United States and Canada.

Murray lived with her husband at Raumati Beach near Wellington.  The couple had three children and six grandchildren. She died on 25 January 2020.

Publications 
In Every Corner Sing (1992)
Every Day in Your Spirit (1996)
Faith Makes the Song (2003)
Touch the Earth Lightly

References 

1931 births
2020 deaths
Christian hymnwriters
New Zealand Presbyterians
Members of the New Zealand Order of Merit
People from Invercargill
University of Otago alumni
20th-century New Zealand women writers
21st-century New Zealand women writers
20th-century New Zealand writers
21st-century New Zealand writers
Women hymnwriters
People educated at Southland Girls' High School